Rwandan or Rwandese may refer to:

 Related to, from, or connected to Rwanda, a country in Africa
 Banyarwanda, inhabitants of the country Rwanda and those of Rwandan ethnicity.
 Kinyarwanda, the language of the Banyarwanda, sometimes known as the Rwandan language.

See also 
 Rwandan cuisine
 Rwandan music
 Rwandan genocide

Language and nationality disambiguation pages